A limited number of Esperanto adverbs do not end with the regular adverbial ending -e. Many of them function as more than just adverbs, such as hodiaŭ "today" (noun or adverb) and ankoraŭ "yet" or "still" (conjunction or adverb). Others are part of the correlative system, and will not be repeated here.

The word class "adverb" is not well defined in any language, and it is sometimes difficult to say whether a word is an adverb. The Esperanto suffix -e is restricted to words that are clearly adverbial.

Adverbs and the suffix -aŭ
Alongside dedicated part-of-speech suffixes of Esperanto, such as adverbial -e, adjectival -a, and nominal -o, the language has a grammatically neutral suffix -aŭ that has no defined part of speech. Words ending in -aŭ may be used for multiple grammatical functions. They are typically words whose part of speech is difficult to identify in other languages. The suffix -aŭ is not lexically productive: it is limited to a closed class of only a few words. To specify the part of speech of these words, the dedicated suffixes may be added to the -aŭ. For example, anstataŭ "instead of" (preposition and conjunction) is the base of the adverb anstataŭe "instead", the adjective anstataŭa "interim" or "deputy", the verb anstataŭi "to take the place of", and the noun anstataŭo "replacement" or "substitution". Most -aŭ words have inherent adverbial uses; anstataŭ is one of the few that do not. The adverbial -aŭ words are:

{| class=wikitable
!Esperanto!!English!!parts of speech
|-
|almenaŭ||at least||conjunction and adverb
|-
|ambaŭ||both||adjective and adverb
|-
|ankaŭ||also|| adverb
|-
|ankoraŭ||still, yet||conjunction and adverb
|-
|apenaŭ||barely|| adverb
|-
|baldaŭ||soon|| adverb
|-
|ĉirkaŭ||around||preposition and adverb
|-
|hieraŭ||yesterday||noun and adverb
|-
|hodiaŭ||today||noun and adverb
|-
|kvazaŭ||as if||conjunction and adverb
|-
|morgaŭ||tomorrow||noun and adverb
|-
|preskaŭ||almost||adverb
|}

Because this -aŭ is a suffix, it may be dropped or replaced by a productive grammatical suffix. For example, alongside anstataŭe and anstataŭigi etc. there are anstate, anstatigi etc., and in poetic usage there is anstat for anstataŭ, but these are rare.

'In 1892 Zamenhof proposed the following change: "Instead of the ending '-aŭ' in various words one can use an apostrophe [e.g. ankor, apen]... This will increase sonorousness, while not introducing any confusion (because '-aŭ' does not belong to the root, but is only a conditional ending, and thus as easy to leave off as the '-o' of the noun)." But this elision of "-aŭ" from adverbs was not put into practice; only in recent years have a few poets attempted to use it in verse.'

"There have already been attempts to use these words in simple adverbial form (morge, apene, anke, ankore, almene, etc.), which would certainly bring along the simple adjectival form (ankora, almena, apena) and the nominal form (hiero, hodio, morgo). These attempts are even officially tolerated by the Academy [since 1910]."

Bare-root adverbs

Other (so-called) adverbs occur as bare roots, without any suffix. Some of these bare-root words are grammatical particles, in which case true adverbs may be derived from them by adding the suffix -e. They are:

{| class=wikitable
!Esperanto!!English!!notes
|-
|for||away|| cf. the derived adverb fore
|-
|jam||already, yet|| cf. the derived adverb jame
|-
|ĵus||just now|| cf. the derived adverb ĵuse
|-
|nun||now|| noun and adverb; cf. the derived nuno and nune respective forms
|-
|nur||only|| cf. the derived adverb nure
|-
|plej||most|| cf. the derived adverb pleje "at most" or "most often"
|-
|pli||more|| pronoun and adverb; cf. the derived adverb plie
|-
|plu||beyond, further|| cf. the derived adverb plue
|-
|tre||very|| No need for added -e due to it ending with -e already
|-
|tro||overly, too much|| cf. the derived adverb troe; root now used as "an excess"
|-
|tuj||at once, immediately|| cf. the derived adverb tuje and noun tujo ('instant')
|}

Occasionally grammatically redundant forms such as tree are seen in poetry.

References

See also
For a complete list of words ending in -aŭ, see :wiktionary:-aŭ.
Esperanto words with the ad hoc suffix -um

Grammar, Adverbs